The 2017–18 season was the first season for Gokulam Kerala. The club competed in I-League and Super Cup.

Review and events

Pre-season
Gokulam Kerala played 2016–17 Kerala Premier League in pre-season. They started the campaign with a victory over Cochin Port Trust on 13 April 2017. They qualified to knockout Stage as group champions from Group A. But they lost against FC Thrissur in semi-final on penalties.

I-League

Gokulam Kerala debuted in I-League against Shillong Lajong on 21 November 2017 and they lost the match. Their first win was in their 4th match against Indian Arrows on 22 December 2017. With 21 points including 6 wins, 3 draws and 9 losses Gokulam Kerala finished 7th in the table.

Indian Super Cup

By finishing 7th in the 2017–18 I-League point table Gokulam Kerala qualified into Qualification round of 2018 Indian Super Cup. Gokulam Kerala won against NorthEast United in the qualifier match on 15 March 2018. Bengaluru FC eliminated Gokulam Kerala in Pre Quarter on 1 April 2018

Players

First-team squad

Players in
All players joined this season. Only winter transfer is listed.

Source:

Players out

Source:

Statistics

Squad appearances and goals

|-
! colspan=10 style=background:#dcdcdc; text-align:center| Goalkeepers

|-
! colspan=10 style=background:#dcdcdc; text-align:center| Defenders

|-
! colspan=10 style=background:#dcdcdc; text-align:center| Midfielders

|-
! colspan=10 style=background:#dcdcdc; text-align:center| Forwards

|-
! colspan=10 style=background:#dcdcdc; text-align:center| Players who have made an appearance or had a squad number this season but have left the club

|-
|}

Squad statistics

Players Used: Gokulam Kerala has used a total of 40 different players in all competitions.

Goalscorers

Clean sheets

Disciplinary record

Competitions

Overview

I-League

Standings

Results summary

Results by round

Matchday

Indian Super Cup

Qualification round

Round of 16

References

See also
 2017–18 in Indian football
 2017–18 I-League

2017–18 I-League by team
Gokulam Kerala FC seasons